Frank Winfird Millar (20 September 1885 – 4 September 1944) was a notable New Zealand public servant and union official. He was born in Dunedin, New Zealand on 20 September 1885.

References

1885 births
1944 deaths
New Zealand trade unionists
New Zealand public servants
People from Dunedin